MarcAlex are a South African musical group who had a hit with their song "Quick Quick", which went to number 1 on the South African music charts in June 1989. The group is made up of brothers Marc and Alex Rantseli.

They won the OKTV Awards for Best Newcomer in 1988 and their song "Heartbreakin' Love" went to number 1 on the 5FM and Radio Metro charts.

References

South African musical groups